Huang Qiuyan (born January 5, 1980) is a Chinese triple jumper.
  
With 14.72 metres Huang is a former Asian record holder in triple jump. The result was achieved in Guangzhou on 22 November 2001.

Achievements

References

External links 
 
 
 
 
 

1980 births
Living people
Chinese female triple jumpers
Olympic athletes of China
Athletes (track and field) at the 2004 Summer Olympics
Asian Games medalists in athletics (track and field)
Asian Games gold medalists for China
Athletes (track and field) at the 2002 Asian Games
Medalists at the 2002 Asian Games